11th Hour is the 11th novel of the Women’s Murder Club series written by American author James Patterson. The main character of this series is Sgt. Lindsay Boxer. The series is a set in San Francisco and the Women's Murder Club is a small group of women who meet with Boxer to help solve sensational crimes in the city. Throughout the series, the membership of the Women's Murder Club has had some changes.

Plot
This book has two major plots. The two major plots involve cases in which Boxer quickly becomes involved. Someone is gunning down San Francisco drug dealers and kills an undercover officer. One of the weapons used was taken from her own department's evidence locker, indicating the involvement of a rogue cop. 
The second major plot involves Boxer, when two heads appear unexpectedly in the garden of a mansion owned by a world-famous actor. More heads are unearthed in the garden.

The first plot concerns Noelle Smith, a violinist, who is giving a gig in front of her father, Chaz Smith, who's killed in the bathroom by a lone avenger, Revenge.
He used a cop, so the circle closes down. But Chaz Smith is revealed to be a cop, too; and Revenge is finally captured by Lindsay Boxer and Rich Conklin; his real name is William Randall and he decided to take revenge on pushers in the name of his son, who was killed by drugs, without anyone paying for his premature death.  

The main plot concerns Janet Wolsley, a woman who finds severed heads in the garden of the mansion she keeps, Elssworth House. The heads are marked with numbers and the investigation starts from there; more heads are found in the garden and the Wolseys become suspected; but Nicole, their daughter, takes them on the trail of Connie Kerr, a former tennis player, who has gone insane but seems to know many things.
Connie Kerr reveals she has found and dug out many more heads in the garden; she intrudes Nicole Wolsey's house to interrogate her but Nicole tries to stab her; Janet comes out and says it was actually her.
It's finally discovered it was both of them, in their thirst of revenge against Harry Chandler - Ellsworth's House's owner - who was Janet's lover but cheated on her with many lovers, who became the victims of their furious anger.

Reviews
At least two professional reviews were written about this book. Joe Hartlaub wrote in the Book Reporter website, "The '11th Hour' . . . may be the best Women's Murder Club novel to date." A second reviewer, Kay Dyer, wrote a review on the News OK website, but did not indicate whether or not she liked the book.

References

2012 American novels
Novels set in San Francisco
Women's Murder Club (novel series)
Little, Brown and Company books
Collaborative novels